Anticipation II is a mixtape by American singer Trey Songz, released on November 1, 2011.

On April 24, 2020, Trey Songz re-released the mixtape on streaming platforms, with the original mixtape in the series Anticipation.

Background and composition
Songz described the material worked for the mixtape as the most "pure" of his, at the time, recent discography. He stated: "Historically, my mixtapes have served as a creative outlet for me to serve my fans without the pressure of creating records solely for sales, this time around the music came out particularly real and good".

Anticipation II is filled with R&B and alternative R&B slow-jams. The lyrical content is for the vast majority about sex, with a songwriting that has been described as "very sultry" and "explicit".

During a 2020 interview with Uproxx, when asked about what his best project to date was, the singer said it was Anticipation II, stating:

Release and promotion
The mixtape was released on November 1, 2011, along with the hip-hop mixtape #LemmeHolDatBeat2 on the same day.

In 2012, Songz performed the mixtape on stage, supporting it with The Anticipation 2our with 19 shows in North America.

In 2020 the project was finally released on all streaming platforms.

Critical reception

AllMusic's writer Andy Kellman gave it four and half out of five stars saying "The R&B singer whispers the most nasty things possible, with impeccable sensual melodies over slow, dark and electronic beats. He overcomes himself on the mesmerizing "Inside Pt 2", using the sound of a woman's orgasm with the same functioning of a guitar solo".

Track listing

References

2011 albums
Trey Songz albums
Sequel albums